Weronika Zawistowska (born 17 December 1999) is a Polish footballer who plays as a forward for 1. FC Köln on loan from Bayern Munich and has appeared for the Poland women's national team.

Career
Zawistowska has been capped for the Poland national team, appearing for the team during the 2019 FIFA Women's World Cup qualifying cycle.

International goals

References

External links
 
 
 

1999 births
Living people
Polish women's footballers
Poland women's international footballers
Women's association football forwards
Górnik Łęczna (women) players
KKS Czarni Sosnowiec players
1. FC Köln (women) players